Rempała is a surname. Notable people with the surname include:

Grzegorz Rempała (born 1968), Polish-American applied mathematician
Marcin Rempała (born 1984), Polish speedway rider

Polish-language surnames